Srinivasan Doraiswamy, known by his stage name Srinivas, is an Indian playback singer who has sung over 2000 songs in Tamil, Malayalam, Telugu, Kannada and Hindi. He has also worked independently as a music composer, working on films and private albums.

Early life
Singer Srinivas was born On 7 November in Ambasamudram in Tamil Nadu to Duraiswamy and Lakshmi.

Career
He was a judge on Airtel Super Singer, aired in Vijay TV along with Sujatha and P. Unnikrishnan. 
In 2010, he released an album: Timeless Classics by Srinivas. This was a tribute to Mehdi Hassan and included major ghazals of him sung by Srinivas. It was released on Saregama and was launched by A. R. Rahman.

Awards
Kalaimamani, Tamil Nadu Government
Best Male Singer - Rathri Mazha, Kerala state film awards
Tamil Nadu State Film Award for Best Male Playback - Padayappa and Onbadhu Roobai Nottu
2017 - Vijay Television Awards for Favourite Judge Male Vijay Television Awards

Discography

Tamil Discography (Selected Songs)

Telugu Discography

Kannada Discography (Selected Songs)

As music composer
Films

Onscreen appearances

Television
Be it Vijay Television  Super singer or Zee Tamil Saregamapa, with his  outspoken comments and the continuous support and encouragement for the contestants throughout the season makes him one of the most favourite judges in the reality shows of Tamil Nadu.

As a judge
Tamil
2006: Airtel Super Singer 2006
2008-2009: Airtel Super Singer 2008
2010-2011: Airtel Super Singer 3
2014: Airtel Super Singer 4
2015-2016: Airtel Super Singer 5
2017-2018: Sa Re Ga Ma Pa Seniors
2019: Sa Re Ga Ma Pa Seniors 2
2021: Rockstar (Indian TV series)
Malayalam
2019: Top Singer Season 1

References

External links
 
 About Srinivas
 Interview with Srinivas

1959 births
Living people
Malayalam playback singers
Indian male playback singers
Kerala State Film Award winners
Tamil playback singers
Singers from Thiruvananthapuram
Tamil musicians
Kannada playback singers
Tamil Nadu State Film Awards winners
Bollywood playback singers
Filmfare Awards South winners
International Tamil Film Award winners
Film musicians from Kerala
20th-century Indian singers
People from Tirunelveli district
21st-century Indian singers
20th-century Indian male singers
21st-century Indian male singers
Institute of Chemical Technology alumni